The National Resistance Front of São Tomé and Príncipe-Renewal (FRNSTP-R) was a political movement of São Toméan exiles who opposed the socialist policies of the single party Movement for the Liberation of São Tomé and Príncipe (MLSTP) government, and sought its overthrow. The FRNSTP-R was formed in 1986 by a small faction of National Resistance Front of São Tomé and Príncipe (FRNSTP) members who refused to give up the idea of armed struggle as a means of overthrowing the São Toméan government. The FRNSTP-R was based Kribi, Cameroon under the leadership of Monso dos Santos.

On 8 March 1988, members of the FRNSTP-R landed in São Tomé with an invasion force of 44 men and attempted to overthrow the government of President Manuel Pinto da Costa. The invaders, who came in canoes from Cameroon and were poorly armed, were easily overwhelmed by the security forces and detained. In August 1989, the invaders were tried by the local court and sentenced to custodial sentences ranging from 2 to 22 years. By April 1990, however, all prisoners had been pardoned by the president and released from prison.

In December 1990, months after a new constitution permitting multiparty politics was approved, former FRNSTP-R members founded the Christian Democratic Front (FDC) party.

Political parties established in 1986
Political parties in São Tomé and Príncipe
1986 establishments in São Tomé and Príncipe